Aston Martin Lagonda Global Holdings PLC is an English manufacturer of luxury sports cars and grand tourers. Its predecessor was founded in 1913 by Lionel Martin and Robert Bamford. Steered from 1947 by David Brown, it became associated with expensive grand touring cars in the 1950s and 1960s, and with the fictional character James Bond following his use of a DB5 model in the 1964 film Goldfinger. Their sports cars are regarded as a British cultural icon. Aston Martin has held a Royal Warrant as purveyor of motorcars to Charles III since 1982, and has over 160 car dealerships in 53 countries, making it a global automobile brand. The company is traded at the London Stock Exchange and is a constituent of the FTSE 250 Index. In 2003 it received the Queen's Award for Enterprise for outstanding contribution to international trade. The company has survived seven bankruptcies throughout its history.

The headquarters and main production of its sports cars and grand tourers are in a 22-hectare (55-acre) facility in Gaydon, Warwickshire, England, on the former site of RAF Gaydon, adjacent to the Jaguar Land Rover Gaydon Centre. The old 3.6-acre facility in Newport Pagnell, Buckinghamshire is the present home of the Aston Martin Works classic car department, which focuses on heritage sales, service, spares and restoration operations. The 36-hectare (90-acre) factory in St Athan, Wales features three converted 'super-hangars' from MOD St Athan, and serves as the production site of Aston Martin's first-ever SUV, the DBX. Aston Martin plans on building electric vehicles on both its Gaydon and St Athan factories by 2025.

Its Formula One team is headquartered in Silverstone, with a new  factory set to be operational by 2023. The factory features three interconnected buildings and is based in a 40-acre site directly opposite the Silverstone circuit. The Aston Martin brand is increasingly being used, mostly through licensing, on other products including a submarine, real estate development, and aircraft.

History

Founding 
Aston Martin was founded in 1913 by Lionel Martin and Robert Bamford. The two had joined forces as Bamford & Martin the previous year to sell cars made by Singer from premises in Callow Street, London where they also serviced GWK and Calthorpe vehicles. Martin raced specials at Aston Hill near Aston Clinton, and the pair decided to make their own vehicles. The first car to be named Aston Martin was created by Martin by fitting a four-cylinder Coventry-Simplex engine to the chassis of a 1908 Isotta Fraschini.

They acquired premises at Henniker Mews in Kensington and produced their first car in March 1915. Production could not start because of the outbreak of the First World War, when Martin joined the Admiralty and Bamford joined the Army Service Corps.

1918–1939: Interwar years 

After the war they found new premises at Abingdon Road, Kensington and designed a new car. Bamford left in 1920 and Bamford & Martin was revitalised with funding from Count Louis Zborowski. In 1922, Bamford & Martin produced cars to compete in the French Grand Prix, which went on to set world speed and endurance records at Brooklands. Three works Team Cars with 16-valve twin cam engines were built for racing and record-breaking: chassis number 1914, later developed as the Green Pea; chassis number 1915, the Razor Blade record car; and chassis number 1916, later developed as the Halford Special.

Approximately 55 cars were built for sale in two configurations; long chassis and short chassis. Bamford & Martin went bankrupt in 1924 and was bought by Dorothea, Lady Charnwood, who put her son John Benson on the board. Bamford & Martin got into financial difficulty again in 1925 and Martin was forced to sell the company (Bamford had already left).

Later that year, Bill Renwick, Augustus (Bert) Bertelli and investors including Lady Charnwood took control of the business. They renamed it Aston Martin Motors and moved it to the former Whitehead Aircraft Limited Hanworth works in Feltham. Renwick and Bertelli had been in partnership some years and had developed an overhead-cam four-cylinder engine using Renwick's patented combustion chamber design, which they had tested in an Enfield-Allday chassis. The only "Renwick and Bertelli" motor car made, it was known as "Buzzbox" and still survives.

The pair had planned to sell their engine to motor manufacturers, but having heard that Aston Martin was no longer in production realised they could capitalise on its reputation to jump-start the production of a completely new car.

Between 1926 and 1937 Bertelli was both technical director and designer of all new Aston Martins, since known as "Bertelli cars". They included the 1½-litre "T-type", "International", "Le Mans", "MKII" and its racing derivative, the "Ulster", and the 2-litre 15/98 and its racing derivative, the "Speed Model". Most were open two-seater sports cars bodied by Bert Bertelli's brother Enrico (Harry), with a small number of long-chassis four-seater tourers, dropheads and saloons also produced.

Bertelli was a competent driver keen to race his cars, one of few owner/manufacturer/drivers. The "LM" team cars were very successful in national and international motor racing including at Le Mans.

Financial problems reappeared in 1932. Aston Martin was rescued for a year by Lance Prideaux Brune before passing it on to Sir Arthur Sutherland. In 1936, Aston Martin decided to concentrate on road cars, producing just 700 until World War II halted work. Production shifted to aircraft components during the war.

1947–1972: David Brown 

In 1947, old-established (1860) privately owned Huddersfield gear and machine tools manufacturer David Brown Limited bought Aston Martin putting it under control of its Tractor Group. David Brown became Aston Martin's latest saviour. He also acquired without its factory Lagonda's business for its 2.6-litre W. O. Bentley-designed engine. Lagonda moved operations to Newport Pagnell and shared engines, resources and workshops. Aston Martin began to build the classic "DB" series of cars.

In April 1950, they announced planned production of their Le Mans prototype to be called the DB2, followed by the DB2/4 in 1953, the DB2/4 MkII in 1955, the DB Mark III in 1957 and the Italian-styled 3.7 L DB4 in 1958.

While these models helped Aston Martin establish a good racing pedigree, the DB4 stood out and yielded the famous DB5 in 1963. Aston stayed true to its grand touring style with the DB6 (1965–70), and DBS (1967–1972).

The six-cylinder engines of these cars from 1954 up to 1965 were designed by Tadek Marek.

1972–1975: William Willson 

Aston Martin was often financially troubled. In 1972, David Brown paid off all its debts, said to be £5 million or more, and handed it for £101 to Company Developments, a Birmingham-based investment bank consortium chaired by accountant William Willson. More detail on this period may be read at Willson's biography. The worldwide recession, lack of working capital and the difficulties of developing an engine to meet California's exhaust emission requirements – it stopped the company's US sales – again pulled Aston Martin into receivership at the end of 1974. The company had employed 460 workers when the manufacturing plant closed.

1975–1981: Sprague and Curtis 
The receiver sold the business in April 1975 for £1.05 million to North American businessmen Peter Sprague of National Semiconductor, Toronto hotelier George Minden, and Jeremy Turner, a London businessman, who insisted to reporters Aston Martin remained a British controlled business. Sprague later claimed he had fallen in love with the factory, not the cars, the workforce's craftsmanship dedication and intelligence. At this point, he and Minden had brought in investor, Alan Curtis, a British office property developer together with George Flather, a retired Sheffield steel magnate.

Six months later, in September 1975, the factory – shut-down the previous December – re-opened under its new owner as Aston Martin Lagonda Limited with 100 employees and plans to lift staff to 250 by the end of 1975. In January 1976, AML revealed that it now held orders for 150 cars for the US, 100 for other markets and another 80 from a Japanese importing agency. At the Geneva Motor Show, Fred Hartley, managing director and sales director for 13 years before that, announced he had resigned over "differences in marketing policy".

The new owners pushed Aston Martin into modernising its line, introducing the V8 Vantage in 1977, the convertible Volante in 1978, and the one-off Bulldog styled by William Towns in 1980. Towns also styled the futuristic new Lagonda saloon, based on the V8 model.

Curtis, who had a 42% stake in Aston Martin, also brought about a change in direction from the usual customers who were Aston Martin fanatics (fans) to successful young married businessmen. Prices had been increased by 25%. There was speculation that AML was about to buy Italian automobile manufacturer Lamborghini. At the end of the 1970s, there was widespread debate about running MG into the Aston Martin consortium. 85 Tory MPs formed themselves into a pressure group to get British Leyland to release their grip and hand it over. CH Industrials plc (car components) bought a 10% share in AML. But in July 1980, blaming a recession, AML cut back their workforce of 450 by more than 20% making those people redundant.

1981–1987: Victor Gauntlett 
In January 1981, there having been no satisfactory revival partners, Alan Curtis and Peter Sprague announced they had never intended to maintain a long-term financial stake in Aston Martin Lagonda and it was to be sold to Pace Petroleum's Victor Gauntlett. Sprague and Curtis pointed out that under their ownership AML finances had improved to where an offer for MG might have been feasible.

Gauntlett bought a 12.5% stake in Aston Martin for £500,000 via Pace Petroleum in 1980, with Tim Hearley of CH Industrials taking a similar share. Pace and CHI took over as joint 50/50 owners at the beginning of 1981, with Gauntlett as executive chairman. Gauntlett also led the sales team, and after some development and publicity when the Lagonda became the world's fastest four-seater production car, was able to sell the car in Oman, Kuwait, and Qatar. In 1982, Aston Martin was granted a Royal Warrant of Appointment by the Prince of Wales.

Understanding that it would take some time to develop new Aston Martin products, they created an engineering service subsidiary to develop automotive products for other companies. It was decided to use a trade name of Salmons & Son, their in-house coachbuilder, Tickford, which Aston Martin had bought in 1955. Tickford's name had been long associated with expensive high-quality carriages and cars along with their folding roofs. New products included a Tickford Austin Metro, a Tickford Ford Capri and even Tickford train interiors, particularly on the Jaguar XJS. Pace continued sponsoring racing events, and now sponsored all Aston Martin Owners Club events, taking a Tickford-engined Nimrod Group C car owned by AMOC President Viscount Downe, which came third in the Manufacturers Championship in both 1982 and 1983. It also finished seventh in the 1982 24 Hours of Le Mans race. However, sales of production cars were now at an all-time low of 30 cars produced in 1982.

As trading became tighter in the petroleum market, and Aston Martin was requiring more time and money, Gauntlett agreed to sell Hays/Pace to the Kuwait Investment Office in September 1983. As Aston Martin required greater investment, he also agreed to sell his share holding to American importer and Greek shipping tycoon Peter Livanos, who invested via his joint venture with Nick and John Papanicolaou, ALL Inc. Gauntlett remained chairman of AML, 55% of the stake was owned by ALL, with Tickford a 50/50 venture between ALL and CHI. The uneasy relationship was ended when ALL exercised options to buy a larger share in AML; CHI's residual shares were exchanged for CHI's complete ownership of Tickford, which retained the development of existing Aston Martin projects. In 1984, Papanicolaou's Titan shipping business was in trouble so Livanos's father George bought out the Papanicolaou's shares in ALL, while Gauntlett again became a shareholder with a 25% holding in AML. The deal valued Aston Martin/AML at £2 million, the year it built its 10,000th car.

Although as a result Aston Martin had to make 60 members of the workforce redundant, Gauntlett bought a stake in Italian styling house Zagato, and resurrected its collaboration with Aston Martin. In 1986, Gauntlett negotiated the return of the fictional British secret agent James Bond to Aston Martin. Cubby Broccoli had chosen to recast the character using actor Timothy Dalton, in an attempt to re-root the Bond-brand back to a more Sean Connery-like feel. Gauntlett supplied his personal pre-production Vantage for use in the filming of The Living Daylights, and sold a Volante to Broccoli for use at his home in America. Gauntlett turned down the role of a KGB colonel in the film, however: "I would have loved to have done it but really could not afford the time."

1987–2007: Ford Motor Company 
As Aston Martin needed funds to survive in the long term, Ford bought a 75% stake in the company in 1987, and bought the rest later. In May of that year, Victor Gauntlett and Prince Michael of Kent were staying at the home of Contessa Maggi, the wife of the founder of the original Mille Miglia, while watching the revival event. Another house guest was Walter Hayes, vice-president of Ford of Europe. Despite problems over the previous acquisition of AC Cars, Hayes saw the potential of the brand and the discussion resulted in Ford taking a share holding in September 1987. In 1988, having produced some 5,000 cars in 20 years, a revived economy and successful sales of limited edition Vantage, and 52 Volante Zagato coupés at £86,000 each; Aston Martin finally retired the ancient V8 and introduced the Virage range.

Although Gauntlett was contractually to stay as chairman for two years, his racing interests took the company back into sports car racing in 1989 with limited European success. However, with engine rule changes for the 1990 season and the launch of the new Volante model, Ford provided the limited supply of Cosworth engines to the Jaguar cars racing team. As the entry-level DB7 would require a large engineering input, Ford agreed to take full control of Aston Martin, and Gauntlett handed over Aston Martin's chairmanship to Hayes in 1991. In 1992, the high-performance variant of the Virage called the Vantage was announced, and the following year Aston Martin renewed the DB range by announcing the DB7.

By 1993, Ford had fully acquired the company after having built a stake in 1987. Ford placed Aston Martin in the Premier Automotive Group, invested in new manufacturing and ramped up production. In 1994, Ford opened a new factory at Banbury Road in Bloxham to manufacture the DB7. In 1995, Aston Martin produced a record 700 cars. Until the Ford era, cars had been produced by hand coachbuilding craft methods, such as the English wheel. During the mid 1990s, the Special Projects Group, a secretive unit with Works Service at Newport Pagnell, created an array of special coach-built vehicles for the Brunei royal family. In 1998, the 2,000th DB7 was built, and in 2002, the 6,000th, exceeding production of all of the previous DB series models. The DB7 range was revamped by the addition of more powerful V12 Vantage models in 1999, and in 2001, Aston Martin introduced the V12-engined flagship model called the Vanquish which succeeded the aging Virage (now called the V8 Coupé).

At the North American International Auto Show in Detroit, Michigan in 2003, Aston Martin introduced the V8 Vantage concept car. Expected to have few changes before its introduction in 2005, the Vantage brought back the classic V8 engine to allow Aston Martin to compete in a larger market. 2003 also saw the opening of the Gaydon factory, the first purpose-built factory in Aston Martin's history. The facility is situated on a 22-hectare (55-acre) site of a former RAF V Bomber airbase, with an  front building for offices, meeting rooms and customer reception, and a  production building. Also introduced in 2003 was the DB9 coupé, which replaced the ten-year-old DB7. A convertible version of the DB9, the DB9 Volante, was introduced at the 2004 Detroit auto show.

In October 2004, Aston Martin set up the dedicated  Aston Martin Engine Plant (AMEP) within the Ford Germany Niehl, Cologne plant. With the capacity to produce up to 5,000 engines a year by 100 specially trained personnel, like traditional Aston Martin engine production from Newport Pagnell, assembly of each unit was entrusted to a single technician from a pool of 30, with V8 and V12 variants assembled in under 20 hours. By bringing engine production back to within Aston Martin, the promise was that Aston Martin would be able to produce small runs of higher performance variants' engines. This expanded engine capacity allowed the entry-level V8 Vantage sports car to enter production at the Gaydon factory in 2006, joining the DB9 and DB9 Volante.

In December 2003, Aston Martin announced it would return to motor racing in 2005. A new division was created, called Aston Martin Racing, which became responsible, together with Prodrive, for the design, development, and management of the DBR9 program. The DBR9 competes in the GT class in sports car races, including the world-famous 24 Hours of Le Mans.

In 2006, an internal audit led Ford to consider divesting itself of parts of its Premier Automotive Group. After suggestions of selling Jaguar Cars, Land Rover, or Volvo Cars were weighed, Ford announced in August 2006 it had engaged UBS AG to sell all or part of Aston Martin at auction.

2007–2018: Private Limited Company 
On 12 March 2007, a consortium led by Prodrive chairman David Richards purchased Aston Martin for £475 million (US$848 million). The group included American investment banker John Sinders and two Kuwaiti companies namely Investment Dar and Adeem Investment. Prodrive had no financial involvement in the deal. Ford kept a stake in Aston Martin valued at £40 million (US$70 million).

To demonstrate the V8 Vantage's durability across hazardous terrain and promote the car in China, the first east–west crossing of the Asian Highway was undertaken between June and August 2007. A pair of Britons drove  from Tokyo to Istanbul before joining the European motorway network for another  to London. The promotion was so successful Aston Martin opened dealerships in Shanghai and Beijing within three months.

On 19 July 2007, the Newport Pagnell plant rolled out the last of nearly 13,000 cars made there since 1955, a Vanquish S. The Tickford Street facility was converted and became the home of the Aston Martin Works classic car department which focuses on heritage sales, service, spares and restoration operations. UK production is now concentrated on the 22-hectare (55-acre) facility in Gaydon on the former RAF V Bomber airbase. In March 2008, Aston Martin announced a partnership with Magna Steyr to outsource manufacture of over 2,000 cars annually to Graz, Austria, reassuringly stating: "The continuing growth and success of Aston Martin is based upon Gaydon as the focal point and heart of the business, with the design and engineering of all Aston Martin products continuing to be carried out there."

More dealers in Europe and the new pair in China brought the total to 120 in 28 countries. On 1 September 2008, Aston Martin announced the revival of the Lagonda marque, proposing a concept car to be shown in 2009 to coincide with the brand's 100th anniversary. The first production cars were slated for production in 2012. In December 2008, Aston Martin announced it would cut its workforce from 1,850 to 1,250 due to the economic recession.

The first four-door Rapide grand tourers rolled out of the Magna Steyr factory in Graz, Austria in 2010. The contract manufacturer provides dedicated facilities to ensure compliance with the exacting standards of Aston Martin and other marques, including Mercedes-Benz. Then CEO of the company, Dr. Ulrich Bez had publicly speculated about outsourcing all of Aston Martin's operations with the exception of marketing. In September 2011, it was announced that production of the Rapide would be returned to Gaydon in the second half of 2012, restoring all of the company's automobile manufacture there.

Italian private equity fund Investindustrial signed a deal on 6 December 2012 to buy a 37.5% stake in Aston Martin, investing £150 million as a capital increase. This was confirmed by Aston Martin in a press release on 7 December 2012. David Richards left Aston Martin in 2013, returning to concentrate on Prodrive.

In April 2013, it was reported that Dr. Ulrich Bez would be leaving his role as the chief executive officer to take up a more ambassadorial position. On 2 September 2014, Aston Martin announced it had appointed the Nissan executive Andy Palmer as the new CEO with Ulrich Bez retaining a position as non-executive chairman. As sales had been declining from 2015, Aston Martin sought new customers (particularly wealthy female buyers) with introducing concept cars like the DBX SUV along with track focused cars like the Vulcan. According to Palmer, the troubles started when sales of the DB9 failed to generate sufficient fund to develop next-generation models which led to a downward spiral of declining sales and profitability.

Palmer outlined that the company plans to develop two new platforms, add a crossover, refresh its supercar lineup and leverage its technology alliance with Daimler as part of its six-year plan to make the 100-year-old British brand consistently profitable. He stated, "In the first century we went bankrupt seven times. The second century is about making sure that is not the case." In preparation for its next-generation of sports cars, the company invested £20 million ($33.4 million) to expand its manufacturing plant in Gaydon. The expansion at the Gaydon plant includes a new chassis and pilot build facility, as well as an extension of the parts and logistics storage area, and new offices.

In 2014, Aston Martin suffered a pre-tax loss of £72 million, almost triple of the amount of 2013 selling 3,500 cars during the year, well below the 7,300 cars sold in 2007 and 4,200 sold in 2013 respectively. In March 2014, Aston Martin issued "payment in kind" notes of US$165 million, at 10.25% interest, in addition to the £304 million of senior secured notes at 9.25% issued in 2011. Aston Martin also had to secure an additional investment of £200 million from its shareholders to fund development of new models. It was reported that Aston Martin's pre-tax losses for 2016 increased by 27% to £162.8 million, the sixth year it continued to suffer a loss.

In 2016, the company selected a 36-hectare (90-acre) site in St Athan, South Wales for its new factory. The Welsh facility was unanimously chosen by Aston's board despite fierce competition from other locations as far afield as the Americas, Eastern Europe, the Middle East, Europe, as well as two other sites in the UK, believed to be Bridgend and Birmingham. The facility featured three existing ‘super-hangars’ of MOD St Athan. Construction work of converting the hangars commenced in April 2017. Aston Martin returned to profit in 2017 after selling over 5,000 cars. The company made a pre-tax profit of £87 million compared with a £163 million loss in 2016. 2017 also marked the return of production of the Newport Pagnell facility ten years after it originally ceased.

2013–present: Partnership with Mercedes-Benz Group 
In December 2013, Aston Martin signed a deal with Mercedes-Benz Group (at the time known as Daimler) to supply the next generation of Aston Martin cars with Mercedes-AMG engines. Mercedes-AMG also was to supply Aston Martin with electrical systems. This technical partnership was intended to support Aston Martin's launch of a new generation of models that would incorporate new technology and engines. In exchange, Mercedes will get as much as 5% equity in Aston Martin and a non-voting seat on its board. The first model to sport the Mercedes-Benz technology was the DB11, announced at the 86th Geneva Motor Show in March 2016. It featured Mercedes-Benz electronics for the entertainment, navigation and other systems. It was also the first model to use Mercedes-AMG V8 engines. In October 2020, Mercedes confirmed it will increase its holding "in stages" from 5% to 20%. In return, Aston Martin will have access to Mercedes-Benz hybrid and electric drivetrain technologies for its future models.

2018–present: Listed on the London Stock Exchange 
After "completing a turnaround for the once perennially loss-making company that could now be valued at up to 5 billion pounds ($6.4 billion)," and now reporting a full-year pre-tax profit of £87 million (compared with a £163 million loss in 2016) Aston Martin in August 2018 announced plans to float the company at the London Stock Exchange as  Aston Martin Lagonda Global Holdings plc. The company was the subject of an initial public offering on the London Stock Exchange on 3 October 2018. In the same year, Aston Martin opened a new vehicle dynamics test and development centre at Silverstone's Stowe Circuit alongside a new HQ in London. In June 2019, the company opened its new 36-hectare (90-acre) factory in St Athan for the production of its first-ever SUV the DBX. The factory was finally completed and officially opened on 6 December 2019. When full production begins in the second quarter of 2020, around 600 people will be employed at the factory, rising to 750 when peak production is reached.

On 31 January 2020 it was announced that Canadian billionaire and investor Lawrence Stroll was leading a consortium, Yew Tree Overseas Limited, who will pay £182 million in return for 16.7% stake in the company. The re-structuring includes a £318 million cash infusion through a new rights issue, generating a total of £500 million for the company. Stroll will also be named as chairman, replacing Penny Hughes. Swiss pharmaceutical magnate Ernesto Bertarelli and Mercedes-AMG Petronas F1 team principal and CEO Toto Wolff have also joined the consortium, acquiring 3.4% and 4.8% stakes, respectively. In March 2020, Stroll increased his stake in the company to 25%.

On 26 May 2020, Aston Martin announced that Andy Palmer had stepped down as CEO. Tobias Moers of Mercedes-AMG will succeed him starting 1 August, with Keith Stanton as interim chief operating officer. In June 2020, the company announced that it cut out 500 jobs as a result of the poor sales, an outcome of the COVID-19 pandemic lockdown. In March 2021, executive chairman Lawrence Stroll stated that the company plans on building electric vehicles by 2025. In May 2022, Aston Martin named 76-year old Amedeo Felisa as the new chief executive officer, replacing Tobias Moers. Roberto Fedeli was also announced as the new chief technical officer.

In July 2022, Saudi Arabia's Public Investment Fund (PIF) will take a stake in the company through a £78 million equity placing as well as a £575 million separate rights issue, giving it two board seats in the company. After the rights issue, the Saudi fund will have a 16.7% stake in Aston Martin, behind the 18.3% holding by Stroll's Yew Tree consortium while the Mercedes-Benz Group will own 9.7%. In September 2022, Chinese automaker Geely acquired a 7.6% stake in the company. In December 2022, Stroll and the Yew Tree consortium increased their stake in the company to 28.29%.

Notable events 
In August 2017, a 1956 Aston Martin DBR1/1 sold at a Sotheby's auction at the Pebble Beach, California Concours d'Elegance for US$22,550,000, which made it the most expensive British car ever sold at an auction, according to Sotheby's. The car was previously driven by Carroll Shelby and Stirling Moss. Other notable Aston Martin models sold at an auction include a 1962 Aston Martin DB4 GT Zagato for US$14,300,000 in New York in 2015, and a 1963 Aston Martin DP215 for US$21,455,000 in August 2018.

Models

Pre-war cars 

 1921–1925 Aston Martin Standard Sports
 1927–1932 Aston Martin First Series
 1929–1932 Aston Martin International
 1932–1932 Aston Martin International Le Mans
 1932–1934 Aston Martin Le Mans
 1933–1934 Aston Martin 12/50 Standard
 1934–1936 Aston Martin Mk II
 1934–1936 Aston Martin Ulster
 1936–1940 Aston Martin 2-litre Speed Models (23 built) The last 8 were fitted with C-type bodywork
 1937–1939 Aston Martin 15/98

Post-war cars 

 1948–1950 Aston Martin 2-Litre Sports (DB1)
 1950–1953 Aston Martin DB2
 1953–1957 Aston Martin DB2/4
 1957–1959 Aston Martin DB Mark III
 1958–1963 Aston Martin DB4
 1961–1963 Aston Martin DB4 GT Zagato
 1963–1965 Aston Martin DB5
 1965–1966 Aston Martin Short Chassis Volante
 1965–1969 Aston Martin DB6
 1967–1972 Aston Martin DBS
 1969–1989 Aston Martin V8
 1977–1989 Aston Martin V8 Vantage
 1986–1990 Aston Martin V8 Zagato
 1989–1996 Aston Martin Virage/Virage Volante
 1989–2000 Aston Martin Virage
 1993–2000 Aston Martin Vantage
 1996–2000 Aston Martin V8 Coupe/V8 Volante
 1993–2003 Aston Martin DB7/DB7 Vantage
 2001–2007 Aston Martin V12 Vanquish/Vanquish S
 2002–2003 Aston Martin DB7 Zagato
 2002–2004 Aston Martin DB AR1
 2004–2016 Aston Martin DB9
 2005–2018 Aston Martin V8 and V12 Vantage
 2007–2012 Aston Martin DBS V12
 2009–2012 Aston Martin One-77
 2010–2020 Aston Martin Rapide/Rapide S
 2011–2012 Aston Martin Virage/Virage Volante
 2011–2013 Aston Martin Cygnet, based on the Toyota iQ
 2012–2013 Aston Martin V12 Zagato
 2012–2018 Aston Martin Vanquish/Vanquish Volante
 2015–2016 Aston Martin Vulcan
 2016–present Aston Martin DB11
 2018–present Aston Martin Vantage
 2018–present Aston Martin DBS Superleggera
 2020–present Aston Martin DBX

Other

 1944 Aston Martin Atom (concept)
 1961–1964 Lagonda Rapide
 1976–1989 Aston Martin Lagonda
 1980 Aston Martin Bulldog (concept)
 1993 Lagonda Vignale (concept)
 2001 Aston Martin Twenty Twenty (Italdesign concept)
 2007 Aston Martin V12 Vantage RS (concept)
 2007–2008 Aston Martin V8 Vantage N400
 2009 Aston Martin Lagonda SUV (concept)
 2010 Aston Martin V12 Vantage Carbon Black Edition
 2010 Aston Martin DBS Carbon Black Edition
 2013 Aston Martin Rapide Bertone Jet 2+2 (concept)
 2013 Aston Martin CC100 Speedster (concept)
 2015 Aston Martin DB10 (concept)
 2015–2016 Lagonda Taraf
 2019 Aston Martin Vanquish Vision (concept)
 2019 Aston Martin DBS GT Zagato
 2020 Aston Martin V12 Speedster
 2022 Aston Martin DBR22

Current models

 Aston Martin DB11
 Aston Martin DBS Superleggera
 Aston Martin DBX
 Aston Martin Vantage
 Aston Martin Valkyrie

Upcoming models

 Aston Martin Valhalla

Gallery

Brand expansion 

Since 2015, Aston Martin has sought to increase its appeal to women as a luxury lifestyle brand. A female advisory panel was established to adapt the design of the cars to the taste of women. In September 2016, a 37-foot-long Aston Martin speedboat was unveiled called the Aston Martin AM37 powerboat. In September 2017, Aston Martin announced that they had partnered with submarine building company Triton Submarines to build a submarine called Project Neptune. Aston Martin has collaborated with the luxury clothing company Hackett London to deliver items of clothing. In November 2017, Aston Martin unveiled a special limited edition bicycle after collaborating with bicycle manufacturer Storck.

Aston Martin and global property developer G&G Business Developments are currently building a 66-storey luxury condominium tower called Aston Martin Residences at 300 Biscayne Boulevard Way in Miami, Florida, which is set for completion in 2021.

In July 2018, Aston Martin unveiled the Volante Vision Concept, a luxury concept aircraft with vertical take-off and landing capabilities. Also in July, a Lego version of James Bond's DB5 car was put on sale and an Aston Martin-branded watch was released in collaboration with TAG Heuer.

In October 2018, Aston Martin announced it was opening a design and brand studio in Shanghai.

Controversy 

In November 2020, Aston Martin was accused with promoting misinformation about electric vehicles after funding a greenwashing report in conjunction with Bosch and a number of other companies.

The scandal - which became known as 'Astongate' - centred around the ties between James Michael Stephens, the Director Global Government & Corporate Affairs at Aston Martin Lagonda Ltd, and a communications agency called Clarendon Communications which was set up by Stephens and used to promote the misinformation report to the British press in the wake of the UK government declaring a ban on the sale of new combustion engine vehicles from 2030 onwards.

Motorsport

Aston Martin is currently associated with two different racing organisations. The Aston Martin Formula One team which competes in the Formula One Championship and Aston Martin Racing which currently competes in the FIA World Endurance Championship. Both racing organisations use the Aston Martin brand, but are not directly owned by Aston Martin. The Aston Martin Formula One team is owned by major Aston Martin shareholder Lawrence Stroll and operated by his company AMR GP, while Aston Martin Racing is  operated by racing company Prodrive as part of a partnership with Aston Martin.

Formula One 

In January 2020, it was announced that the Racing Point F1 Team is due to be rebranded as Aston Martin for the 2021 season, as a result of a funding investment led by Racing Point owner Lawrence Stroll. As part of the rebrand, the team switched their racing colour of BWT pink to a modern iteration of Aston Martin's British racing green. The Aston Martin AMR21 was unveiled in March 2021 and became Aston Martin's first Formula One car after a 61-year absence from the sport.

Racing cars (post-war)

 Aston Martin DB3 (1950–1953)
 Aston Martin DB3S (1953–1956)
 Aston Martin DBR1 (1956–1959)
 Aston Martin DBR2 (1957–1958)
 Aston Martin DBR3 (1958)
 Aston Martin DBR4 (1959)
 Aston Martin DBR5 (1960)
 Aston Martin DP212 (1962)
 Aston Martin DP214 (1963)
 Aston Martin DP215 (1963)
 Aston Martin RHAM/1 (1976–1979)
 Aston Martin AMR1 (1989)
 Aston Martin AMR2 (never raced)
 Aston Martin DBR9 (2005–2008)
 Aston Martin DBRS9 (2005–2008)
 Aston Martin V8 Vantage N24 (2006–2008)
 Aston Martin V8 Vantage Rally GT (2006–2010)
 Aston Martin V8 Vantage GT2 (2008–2017)
 Aston Martin V8 Vantage GT4 (2008–2018)
 Aston Martin DBR1-2 (2009)
 Aston Martin AMR-One (2011)
 Aston Martin Vantage GTE (2018–)
 Aston Martin AMR21 (2021)
 Aston Martin AMR22 (2022)
 Aston Martin AMR23 (2023)

Aston Martin-powered racing cars

 Cooper-Aston Martin (1963)
 Lola T70-Aston Martin (1967)
 Aston Martin DPLM (1980–1982)
 Nimrod NRA/C2-Aston Martin (1982–1984)
 Aston Martin EMKA C83/1 and C84/1 (1983–1985)
 Cheetah G604-Aston Martin
 Lola B08/60-Aston Martin (2008–)

24 Hours of Le Mans finishes

Sponsorships
Aston Martin sponsors 2. Bundesliga club 1860 Munich.

See also
 Aston Martin Heritage Trust Museum
 Aston Martin Owners Club
 List of car manufacturers of the United Kingdom

References

External links

 

 
1913 establishments in England
2018 initial public offerings
Automotive companies of England
British racecar constructors
British Royal Warrant holders
Car brands
Car manufacturers of the United Kingdom
Companies based in Warwickshire
Companies listed on the London Stock Exchange
English brands
Luxury motor vehicle manufacturers
Motor vehicle manufacturers of England
Premier Automotive Group
Sports car manufacturers
Vehicle manufacturing companies established in 1913